Leonard Etienne De Paur (November 18, 1914 – November 7, 1998) was an American composer, choral director, and arts administrator.

Early life 
Leonard De Paur was born in Summit, New Jersey to Hettie Carson de Paur and Ernst Leonard. He moved to Jersey City with his mother, after his parents separated, and attended the local public schools. His musical studies began at the Manual Training Institute in Bordentown, New Jersey, where he played oboe and saxophone. He attended with Frederick Work, brother of John Wesley Work II and uncle of John Wesley Work III.

Career
De Paur began to compose and arrange while he was a member of the Hall Johnson Choir. He sang in the baritone section and served as assistant conductor alongside Jester Hairston. In 1936, De Paur became the musical director of the Negro Unit of the Federal Theater Project in New York City. During this time he was also enrolled at Columbia University and later went on to study at the Institute of Musical Arts, now the Juilliard School.

In 1941 he collaborated with the conductor Alexander Smallens and the orchestral accordionist John Serry Sr. in an oratorio production of Virgil Thomson's opera Four Saints in Three Acts at New York City's Town Hall. De Paur enlisted in the United States Army Air Forces in 1942, was promoted to Lieutenant, and became the music director of the play Winged Victory. During a stint in the infantry, he was assigned to an all male-chorus.
The De Paur Infantry Chorus was made up of 35 men from the 372nd Glee Club. Their performances consisted of art song repertory, Caribbean folk music, spirituals, work songs and military songs. In 1946, the De Paur Infantry Chorus was signed to Columbia Artists Management and Columbia Records. The chorus now consisted of men from the 372nd Glee Club, other branches of Armed services, and civilians. For ten years the De Paur Infantry Chorus was the top performing group at Columbia. In 1957, De Paur discontinued the chorus and produced the De Paur Opera Gala, which featured Virgil Thomson's Four Saints in Three Acts, George Gershwin's Porgy and Bess and Oscar Hammerstein's Carmen Jones.

In the early 1960s, the De Paur Chorus was formed to tour 18 African nations under the United States Information Agency. Shortly after the chorus disbanded in 1968, De Paur became the associate director of the Lincoln Center International Choral Festival. A few years later he was named the director of community relations. He created the Lincoln Center Out-of-Doors Festival and the Community Holiday Concert Series. He retired from the Lincoln Center in 1988.

During his career De Paur received honorary Doctor of Music degree from Lewis and Clark College. He was the recipient of the University of Pennsylvania Glee Club Award of Merit and an honorary member of the Morehouse College Glee Club.

De Paur died in Manhattan on November 7, 1998.

References

External links 
Guide to the Collection of De Paur Chorus Materials, Center of Black Music Research, Columbia College Chicago
Beware of Pretty Chords
Leonard De Paur's Obituary in Opera News (February 1, 1999)

1914 births
1998 deaths
20th-century American composers
20th-century American male musicians
20th-century classical composers
African-American classical composers
American classical composers
African-American male classical composers
American male classical composers
Bordentown School alumni
Classical musicians from New Jersey
Columbia University alumni
Juilliard School alumni
Musicians from Jersey City, New Jersey
Musicians from Summit, New Jersey
20th-century African-American musicians
Federal Theatre Project people